Aristobia is a genus of longhorn beetles of the subfamily Lamiinae, containing the following species:

 Aristobia angustifrons Gahan, 1888
 Aristobia approximator (Thomson, 1865)
 Aristobia freneyi Schmitt, 1992
 Aristobia hispida (Saunders, 1853)
 Aristobia horridula (Hope, 1831)
 Aristobia laosensis Jiroux, Garreau, Bentanachs & Prévost, 2014
 Aristobia quadrifasciata Aurivillius, 1916
 Aristobia reticulator (Fabricius, 1781) (= testudo)
 Aristobia tavakiliani Jiroux, Garreau, Bentanachs & Prévost, 2014
 Aristobia umbrosa (Thomson, 1865)
 Aristobia vietnamensis Breuning, 1972
 Aristobia voeti Thomson, 1868

References

Lamiini
Cerambycidae genera